The  is a series of ancient pilgrimage routes that crisscross the Kii Hantō, the largest peninsula of Japan. These trails were used by pilgrims to "Kumano Sanzan" (熊野三山) or the Three Grand Shrines of Kumano: Kumano Hongū Taisha (熊野本宮大社), Kumano Nachi Taisha (熊野那智大社) and Kumano Hayatama Taisha (熊野速玉大社).

The Kumano Kodō pilgrimage routes that lead to Kumano can be categorized into three sub-routes: Kiji; Kohechi; and Iseji.

On 7 July 2004 the Kumano Kodō and Kumano Sanzan, along with Koyasan and Yoshino and Omine, were registered as World Heritage sites together as the "Sacred Sites and Pilgrimage Routes in the Kii Mountain Range".

Kiiji route
The "Kiiji" route runs along the west coast of the peninsula to the city of Tanabe, where it forks into two more routes: Nakahechi; and Ohechi. The Nakahechi route leads into the rugged interior mountains toward Kumano Hongū Taisha, and the Ohechi continues south along the coast. The Nakahechi route was the most popular for pilgrimages from Kyoto, the ancient capital of Japan. The earliest records of this route dates from the early 10th century. The trail has a long history of use by people with diverse belief backgrounds leading to mixed religious symbolism overlaid and incorporated into the setting and stages of the pilgrimage itself.

The UNESCO World Heritage registered section begins at Takijiri-oji, which is considered to be the point of entry to the sacred area of Kumano. From here it is about 40 km of mountainous trail before one reaches the mystical Kumano Hongū Taisha. Most pilgrimages break the journey into a two-day walk. The Chikatsuyu-oji is about halfway, and most pilgrims stay the night here at a minshuku.

In Hongū, pilgrims often did purification rites in Yunomine Onsen (Yunomine hot spring). Tsuboyu is a small cabin on the creek that runs through this isolated village, featuring a small rocky bath that is the only World Heritage hot spring open to visitors. The bath was used for purification rites and its legendary healing effects.

The Kumano Kodō Dainichi-goe route links Kumano Hongū Taisha with Yunomine. It is 2 km long and is a steep climb, and descends over a small pass.

From Kumano Hongū Taisha, most pilgrims went by boat on the Kumano River to Kumano Hayatama Taisha in the coastal town of Shingū. This 40 km section of the Kumano Kodō is the only river pilgrimage route that is registered as a World Heritage site. An overland route links Kumano Hongū Taisha with Kumano Nachi Taisha. Most pilgrims take two days to complete this walk, staying overnight in the small town of Koguchi. The section between Hongū and Koguchi is called the Kogumotori-goe, and the section between Koguchi and Kumano Nachi Taisha is called Ogumotori-goe.

Kohechi route
The "Kohechi" route links Koyasan to the Kumano Sanzan. It runs north to south and is 70 km long. It is the shortest route connecting Koyasan to Kumano but is a tough walk that traverses three passes of over 1,000 meters elevation gain.

Iseji route
The "Iseji" route links Ise Grand Shrine with the Kumano Sanzan. It was not until the 17th century that this route became part of the Saikogu pilgrimage, the first temple being Seiganto-ji, which is closely related to the Kumano Nachi Taisha.

The "Magose Toge" forms the boundary between Miyama, Kyoto and Owase, Mie. A moss-covered stone path stretches about 2 km into the beautiful cypress forest covered with ferns. This route leads to Tengura-san with a huge stone at the tip. A small tunnel below the stone can be entered. From the stone is a scenic view of Owase City. Magose-koen Park on the way down the pass is renowned for its cherry blossoms.

Gallery

See also
Japan 100 Kannon Pilgrimage
Shikoku Pilgrimage
Tourism in Japan
The 100 Views of Nature in Kansai

References

Bibliography
 .

External links 
A guide to hiking the famous Nakahechi route
Tanabe City Kumano Tourism Bureau
Iseji information
Shingu City Tourist Association
Kumano Kodo, from The Official Nara Travel Guide
Kumano Kodo Center in Owase

Shinto
Tourist attractions in Wakayama Prefecture
Roads in Wakayama Prefecture
History of Wakayama Prefecture
World Heritage Sites in Japan
Japanese pilgrimages